Sir William Russell, 4th Baronet (c.1654 – September 1709) was an Anglo-Irish politician. 

Russell was the son of Sir John Russell, 3rd Baronet and Frances Cromwell, the youngest daughter of Oliver Cromwell. Between 1692 and 1693, he was a Member of Parliament for Carlow Borough in the Irish House of Commons. In March 1669 he succeeded to his father's baronetcy.

He married Catherine Gore, and upon his death, Russell was succeeded by their eldest son, William.

References

Year of birth uncertain
1709 deaths
17th-century Anglo-Irish people
Baronets in the Baronetage of England
Irish MPs 1692–1693
Members of the Parliament of Ireland (pre-1801) for County Carlow constituencies